Nanjing Incident may refer to:

Nanjing incident of 1616, set-back for Christianity during the Ming dynasty
Nanking incident of 1927, 1927 anti-foreigner riots during the Northern Expedition
Nanjing Massacre, 1937 massacre during the Second Sino-Japanese War, euphemistically called the "Nanjing Incident" (Nankin Jiken) in some Japanese sources
Nanjing Incident (1976), movement to oppose the Cultural Revolution

See also
 Nanjing (disambiguation)
 Nanking (disambiguation)
 Battles of Nanking, various battles